Events in the year 1981 in the Republic of India.

Incumbents
 President of India – Neelam Sanjiva Reddy
 Prime Minister of India – Indira Gandhi
 Chief Justice of India – Yeshwant Vishnu Chandrachud

Governors
 Andhra Pradesh – K. C. Abraham 
 Assam – L. P. Singh (until 10 August), Prakash Mehrotra (starting 10 August)
 Bihar – Akhlaqur Rahman Kidwai 
 Gujarat – Sharda Mukherjee 
 Haryana – Ganpatrao Devji Tapase 
 Himachal Pradesh – Amin ud-din Ahmad Khan (until 26 August), A. K. Banerjee (starting 26 August)
 Jammu and Kashmir – L. K. Jha (until 22 February), B. K. Nehru (starting 22 February)
 Karnataka – Govind Narain 
 Kerala – Jothi Venkatachalam 
 Madhya Pradesh – 
 until 25 May: B. D. Sharma 
 25 May-9 July: G. P. Singh 
 starting 9 July: B. D. Sharma
 Maharashtra – O. P. Mehra 
 Manipur – L.P. Singh (until 18 August), S. M. H. Burney (starting 18 August)
 Meghalaya – L.P. Singh (until 11 August), Prakash Mehrotra (starting 11 August)
 Nagaland – L.P. Singh (until 11 August), S. M. H. Burney (starting 11 August)
 Odisha – Cheppudira Muthana Poonacha
 Punjab – Jaisukh Lal Hathi (until 26 August), Aminuddin Ahmad Khan (starting 26 August)
 Rajasthan – Raghukul Tilak (until 8 August), K. D. Sharma (starting 8 August)
 Sikkim – B. B. Lal (until 9 January), Homi J. H. Taleyarkhan (starting 10 January)
 Tamil Nadu – Sadiq Ali
 Tripura – L. P. Singh (until 18 August), S. M. H. Burney (starting 18 August)
 Uttar Pradesh – Chandeshwar Prasad Narayan Singh 
 West Bengal – Tribhuvana Narayana Singh (until 12 September), Bhairab Dutt Pande (starting 12 August)

Events
 National income - 1,727,755 million
 April 30 - Nearly 48 killed in Bihar Sharif due to communal riots between Yadavs and Muslims.
 July – About 308 people die in Bangalore after drinking illicit liquor (see: 1981 Karnataka liquor deaths).
 Arasan Ganesan Polytechnic is founded in Sivakasi, Tamil Nadu. It is a Government aided co-educational technical institute.
 National Aluminium Company incorporated as a public sector enterprise of the Government of India.
 2 July – Infosys is founded in Pune.
 4 December - Around 45 people got killed due to a stampede at Qutb Minar resulting in closure of Minaret for tourists.

Law

Births

3 January – Sanggai Chanu, field hockey player.
25 February – Anuj Sawhney, actor and model.
Saroo Brierley, writer 
9 June – Celina Jaitley, actress.
17 June – Amrita Rao, model and actress.
19 June – Gulzar Khan, philosopher and mathematician.
7 July – Mahendra Singh Dhoni, cricketer.
3 August – Manish Paul, Indian television host, anchor and actor
25 August – Shiva Keshavan, luge pilot
30 August – Shilpa Prabhakar Satish, IAS.
5 September  H. Vinoth, film director.
27 September – Lakshmipathy Balaji, cricketer.
7 October – Abhijeet Sawant, singer and winner of Indian Idol (season 1).
12 October  Sneha, actress.
14 October – Gautam Gambhir, Cricketer and politician 
7 November  Anushka Shetty, actress.
27 November – Vikram Pillay, field hockey player.
9 December – Dia Mirza, actress and model.
12 December -
Ashok, actor.
Yuvraj Singh, cricketer.

Deaths
3 May – Nargis, actress (born 1929).
19 June – Subhas Mukhopadhyay, Physician created World's second IVF (born 1931)
24 September – Brahmarishi Hussain Sha, seventh head of Sri Viswa Viznana Vidya Adhyatmika Peetham and scholar (born 1905).
26 December – Savitri, actress (born 1936).
28 December – David Abraham Cheulkar, actor (born 1908).

See also 
 List of Bollywood films of 1981

References

 
India
Years of the 20th century in India
1980s in India
India